Jens Werner (born c. 1964) is a Danish ballroom dancer.

Werner began dancing at age four, and at age 30 in 1994, was the World Amateur Champion. Werner lives just north of Copenhagen and opened his own dance studio in 2006. Werner has participated in season 2004, 2005, 2006, 2007, 2008, 2009, 2010, 2011, 2012 and 2013 as the number one adjudicator in Vild med dans which is the Danish version of Dancing with the Stars.  He has also danced on the youth-oriented television station TV 2 Zulu, scantily clad.

References

External links
 ,  

20th-century Danish dancers 
21st-century Danish dancers
Danish ballroom dancers
Danish male dancers
living people
1964 births